Wise River is an unincorporated community in northern Beaverhead County, Montana, United States. State Highway 43 runs through the town.

This community takes its name from the Wise River, which flows into the Big Hole River nearby. A post office was established in 1913.

Demographics

Education
Wise River provides elementary education. High school is at Beaverhead County High School.

Notes

Unincorporated communities in Beaverhead County, Montana
Unincorporated communities in Montana